A by-election was held for the New South Wales Legislative Assembly electorate of Yass Plains on 2 January 1878 because Michael Fitzpatrick was appointed Colonial Secretary in the Farnell ministry. Such ministerial by-elections were usually uncontested and on this occasion the six other ministers were re-elected unopposed.

Dates

Result

Michael Fitzpatrick was appointed Colonial Secretary in the Farnell ministry.

See also
Electoral results for the district of Yass Plains
List of New South Wales state by-elections

References

1878 elections in Australia
New South Wales state by-elections
1870s in New South Wales